The Tadjena massacre was an incident resulting in 81 deaths. The manner of killing is reported to have been notably sadistic, mutilating victims and burning corpses; CNN quoted a survivor as saying that "attackers slashed the throats of children, cutting the arms and legs off one of them and throwing the body in a boiling pot." In addition, 20 women (8 according to initial reports) were kidnapped. Another 7 people had been killed there on the previous night. The massacre took place about ten days before the beginning of Ramadan.

The massacre was reported by a Member of Parliament in a televised parliamentary debate.  The massacre site was later visited by the Interior Minister, Mostefa Bensamour.  The authorities announced a manhunt for the murderers responsible on the national radio, and declared that a "terrorist band" was responsible.  A nearby mountain was described as a major Armed Islamic Group (GIA) base; the GIA is thus presumed to be responsible.  However (at least as of December 10, 1998) no group had admitted to the massacre.

Tadjena was later subjected to a second smaller massacre on the 25–26 May 2003, when 7 people were killed on the 25th and another 14 from a single family on the 26th.

See also
 List of massacres in Algeria
 List of Algerian massacres of the 1990s

References

External links
 BBC
 AP Report - 10th
 AP report - 11th
 AP
 CNN - 9th
 CNN - 10th
 Massacre de Tadjena- Nuit du 8 au 9 décembre 1998 (French, with photos)
 Humanite
 Voice of America

Algerian massacres of the 1990s
1998 in Algeria
Conflicts in 1998
Massacres in 1998
December 1998 events in Africa